The Qoltuq nagara(Armpit drum) is a folk drum with double head that is played on one side with the bare hands. It is used in Armenia, Turkey, Iranian Azerbaijanis, Azerbaijan  Georgia and other Caucasus regions. It has different names, according to the territory in which it is played. This membranophone is different from the dhol and nagara of India.

Dhol in Armenia
The dhol is a common folk instrument played in Armenia, as well as historically throughout Armenian history, since the times of Cilicia, the Armenian Kingdom. The dhol may be played with sticks, mallets, or with the palms of the hands and the fingers. Once used during military campaigns, the dhol is now played in folkloric trios (the duduk and zurna complementing the dhol) and orchestra.

The Armenian Highlands have been home to Armenians for thousands of years, so it is believed that either the Armenian merchants from Silk Road brought the instrument from India, or vis-versa.

Nagara in Turkey
The nağara (also called koltuk davulu) is a Turkish folk drum or percussion instrument. It is placed under the arm and beaten with the hands. It is longer compared to the regular drums and its diameter is smaller.

Doli in Georgia

The doli is played across Georgia in the Caucasus. The body consists of a hollow wooden cylinder covered with leather tightly attached to it with iron rings. It is played by palms and fingers, under or over the arm, while sitting or dancing. It is struck in the center to get the forte effect and at the edges to get a piano effect. The doli’s height and diameter of the body and head is about 3 to 1. It is mostly men who play the doli. In performance, the doli creates the rhythm of the dance.  The doli is often combined with other regional instruments including the chonguri, the chiboni, the salamuri, the buzika and the duduki.

Nagara in Azerbaijan
Since the state of Azerbaijan was founded in 1918, the prototype of dhol of neighbouring countries has been adapted to locals and associated with Turkish Nagara, used widely across the country today. There is a proverb in the Azerbaijani language (Turkish language) that says "toy-dan-sora-naghara!" This literally means after the wedding ceremonies naghara!

This instrument helped the doctors to deal with bad mood, melancholy, intellectual and physical exhaustion, as well as low blood pressure. It was considered that the Naghara could be substituted for some medicinal plants like spicy cloves. The rhythmic beating of the naghara is believed to lead to the strengthening of the heart. The naghara is described in the Early Middle Age Turkish literary epic, "Kitabi Dada Gorgud" (Book of Dede Korkut) (The Book of my Grandfather). Instruments resembling the Naghara were also well known in ancient Egypt.

Doul Baraban

In Circassia and Dagestan, this type of cylindrical folk drum (with two skin heads) is called the baraban. It is different from the baraban (drum) of mainland Russia, which is played with sticks. See also Circassian Music.

Jergh
In Chechnya there is a double-headed drum named jergh or watt.

Gallery

See also
Naqara
Naqareh
Kudum
Dhol

References

External links
https://web.archive.org/web/20080202222935/http://www.discoverturkey.com/english/kultursanat/b-h-nagara.html
http://azeri.org/Azeri/az_latin/manuscripts/music_therapy/english/113_music_therapy_farid.html
http://world-beats.com/instruments/dhol.htm
page for the Naghara at nasehpour website
Youtube Video - Baraban from Circassia
Youtube Video - Baraban from Dagestan

Drums
Hand drums
Asian percussion instruments
Turkish musical instruments
Azerbaijani music
Music of Georgia (country)
Azerbaijani musical instruments
Dagestanian musical instruments
Musical instruments of Georgia (country)
Turkmen musical instruments